Bashkend may refer to:
Artsvashen, Exclave of Armenia, officially called Bashkand
Gegharkunik, Gegharkunik, Armenia, formerly Bashkend
Vernashen, Armenia, formerly Bashkend

See also
Başkənd (disambiguation)
Başköy (disambiguation)